USS LST-325 is a decommissioned tank landing ship of the United States Navy, now docked in Evansville, Indiana, US. Like many of her class, she was not named and is properly referred to by her hull designation (LSTs in service after July 1955 were named after U.S. counties and parishes).

The ship was listed on the U.S. National Register of Historic Places in 2009.  The property was added to the National Register of Historic Places (NRHP) on 24 June 2009 and the listing was announced as the featured listing in the National Park Service's weekly list of 2 July 2009.

Service history

US Navy, 1942-1961
LST-325 was launched on 27 October 1942 at Philadelphia, Pennsylvania, and commissioned on 1 February 1943 under Lt. Ira Ehrensall, USNR. The ship operated in the North Africa area and participated in the invasions at Gela, Sicily and Salerno, Italy. On 6 June 1944, LST-325 was part of the largest armada in history by participating in the Normandy Landings at Omaha Beach. She carried 59 vehicles, 30 officers and a total of 396 enlisted men on that first trip. On her first trip back to England from France, LST-325 transported 38 casualties back to a friendly port. Over the next nine months, Navy records show LST-325 made more than 40 trips across the English Channel, carrying thousands of men and pieces of equipment needed by troops to successfully complete the liberation of Europe. The ship continued to run supply trips between England and France before returning to the United States in May 1945. LST-325 was decommissioned on 2 July 1946, at Green Cove Springs, Florida, and laid up in the Atlantic Reserve Fleet.

The ship was placed in service with the Military Sea Transportation Service in 1951 as USNS T-LST-325, and took part in "Operation SUNAC" (Support of North Atlantic Construction), venturing into the Labrador Sea, Davis Strait, and Baffin Bay to assist in the building of radar outposts along the eastern shore of Canada and western Greenland.

Struck from the Naval Vessel Register, on 1 September 1961, T-LST-325 was transferred to the Maritime Administration (MARAD) for lay up in the National Defense Reserve Fleet.

Hellenic Navy, 1964-1999
T-LST-325 was sent to Greece on 1 September 1964, as part of the grant-in-aid program. She served in the Hellenic Navy as RHS Syros (L-144) from 1964 to 1999.

USS LST Ship Memorial Museum
The USS LST Memorial, Inc., a group of retired military men, acquired Syros in 2000. They travelled to Greece, made the necessary repairs to the ship and sailed her back to the United States, arriving in Mobile Harbor on 10 January 2001. In 2003, LST-325 made a sentimental journey up the Mississippi and Ohio rivers. The 10-day stop in Evansville, Indiana, allowed more than 35,000 people to take a tour. In May and June 2005, she sailed up the east coast under her own power for a 60-day tour of several ports, visiting Alexandria, Virginia, and Buzzard's Bay, Boston, Gloucester, Massachusetts. LST-325 is one of the last navigable LSTs in operation in the U.S. Others include  in daily use as a ferry between Orient, New York and New London, Connecticut, and the dredge MV Columbia operating on the Gulf Coast. On 1 October 2005, Evansville, Indiana, became her home port (although she still visits other ports each year).

Evansville
During World War II, the Evansville, Indiana, riverfront was transformed into a  shipyard to produce LSTs. At its peak, the Evansville Shipyard employed a workforce of over 19,000 and completed two of these massive ships per week, becoming the largest inland producer of LSTs in the US. Although the Evansville Shipyard was originally contracted to build 24 ships, the city would eventually produce 167 LSTs and 35 other vessels. LST-325 is now home ported in Evansville as a memorial museum to LSTs and the city's war effort.

Relocation
In 2018, plans were announced to relocate LST-325 from its Marina Pointe location to Riverfront Park across from Tropicana Evansville, a spot previously occupied by the casino's riverboat, which retired in 2017 when the casino was allowed to move onshore. On 13 June 2020, LST-325 moved to its new port on Riverside Drive in Evansville.

References

External links
 The USS LST Ship Memorial
 
 Details of LST-325's journey home
 

 

Museum ships in Indiana
World War II amphibious warfare vessels of the United States
Ships built in Philadelphia
1942 ships
LST-1-class tank landing ships of the United States Navy
Ships on the National Register of Historic Places in Indiana
Military and war museums in Indiana
Museums in Evansville, Indiana
Monuments and memorials in Indiana
Tourist attractions in Evansville, Indiana
National Register of Historic Places in Evansville, Indiana